Dato Hanifah Hajar Taib  also known as Hanifah Hajar Taib-Alsree (born 1972) is a Malaysian politician and businesswoman who has served as the Deputy Minister of Economy in the Pakatan Harapan (PH) administration under Prime Minister Anwar Ibrahim and Minister Rafizi Ramli since December 2022 and the Member of Parliament (MP) for Mukah since May 2018. She served as the Deputy Minister in the Prime Minister's Department in charge of Sabah and Sarawak Affairs for the second term in the Barisan Nasional (BN) administration under former Prime Minister Ismail Sabri Yaakob and Minister Maximus Ongkili from August 2021 to the collapse of the PN administration in November 2022 and the first term in the Perikatan Nasional (PN) administration under former Prime Minister Muhyiddin Yassin and Minister Maximus Ongkili from March 2020 to August 2021. She is a member of the Parti Pesaka Bumiputera Bersatu (PBB), a component party of the Gabungan Parti Sarawak (GPS) coalition which is aligned with the PN coalition and a former component party of the Barisan Nasional (BN) coalition.She is also the daughter of Abdul Taib Mahmud, the Yang di-Pertua Negeri of Sarawak.

Background
Hanifah is the youngest daughter of Yang di-Pertua Negeri of Sarawak Tun Abdul Taib Mahmud, who was the longest-serving Chief Minister of Sarawak. She graduated from the University of San Francisco with a Bachelor of Science in Business Administration.

Before venturing into politics, she spent about two decades working in different fields. She serves as chief executive officer at Limkokwing University of Creative Technology as well as the Executive Director at Cats FM and Miri Marriott Resort & Spa. She is also a shareholder of Cahya Mata Sarawak Berhad and the Non-Independent & non-executive director of Sarawak Cable Berhad. She is also the Chairman of Pertubuhan Kebajikan Islam Malaysia (PERKIM) Wanita Bahagian Sarawak.

Hanifah is married to a Singaporean businessman Datuk Syed Ahmad Alwee Alsree since 2000. In 2017, her wealth was estimated at RM 309 million, making her one of the richest women in Malaysia.

Election results

Honours

  Commander of the Order of the Star of Sarawak (PSBS) – Dato (2013)

References 

1972 births
Living people
Malaysian Muslims
Women members of the Dewan Rakyat
Women in Sarawak politics
Members of the Dewan Rakyat
Parti Pesaka Bumiputera Bersatu politicians